Traditionally children aged three and up in the Maldives were educated in traditional schools known as "Kiyavaage" or "Edhurge", generally using a single large room or the shelter of tree. The children learn simple arithmetic, Dhivehi and some Arabic, and practice reciting the Qur'an. These private schools no longer exist, as western style schools replaced them in the 1980s-1990s·

The first western-style school in the Maldives is the Majeediyya School, a secondary established in 1927. The school was originally co-educational, but it was felt necessary to create a second school for girls (Aminiyya School) in 1944.

Based on a study by educational advisors from UNESCO, the Government of Maldives began implementation of the  Educational Development Project on 6 October 1976. This Project constituted a comprehensive programme of educational development comprising Expansion of Primary Education, Teacher Training, Curriculum Development, Educational Radio, Community Education Programme for Adult Education and Textbook Development and Printing. The first School under this Project was opened in Baa Atoll Eydhafushi in March 1978 followed by another 2 in N. Manadhoo and HDh. Kulhudhuffushi in March 1979. Schools construction was continued in all atolls and was later complemented by Primary Schools construction project by Japan. Curriculum Development began in 1976, while Teacher Training began in 1977. Simultaneously other Programmes were introduced and continued through the 1970s and until the mid-1980s from where on the First Ten Year Master Plan for Educational (1986-1995) began implementation. Second Master Plan was implemented 1996–2005. These were the bases of educational development in the Maldives begun by the government of President Nasir continued by President Gayoom.

As of 2002, the President's Office claimed that universal primary education has almost been achieved and the literacy rate had improved from 70 percent in 1978 to 98.82 percent. In 2005, there were 106,220 students in schools, or 40% of the total population.

Higher education
A National University Act was passed in January 2011 to establish the first university in the Maldives. Institutions offering higher education in the Maldives are:
Maldives National University, which was previously known as the Maldives College of Higher Education. The college had offered 95% of the post-secondary education in the Maldives
Cyryx College 
Mandhu College , which provides tertiary education to lower and higher secondary school leavers.
Villa College , which has offered degree courses in computing and IT since 2007.
MAPS College 
Ixcel Centre for Professional Studies 
Avid College 
Maldives Business School 
Maldives Polytechnic

See also
List of schools in the Maldives
List of universities and colleges in Asia

References

External links 
 Developing Education Master Plan (2006 - 2015) (dhivehiobserver.com)
 https://web.archive.org/web/20050407060243/http://www.hellomaldives.com/maldives/education/contents.htm hellomaldives.com
 http://www.themaldives.com/Maldives/Maldives_education.htm theMaldives.com

 
Maldives
Universities